José María Ceballos Vega (born 7 September 1968) is a Spanish former footballer who played as a goalkeeper.

Club career
Born in Pámanes, Cantabria, Ceballos only played for local club Racing de Santander during his career, which spanned 16 professional seasons. He started as a senior with Rayo Cantabria, at the time the reserve team, and was already first-choice at the age of 20 in the 1989–90 campaign, suffering relegation from Segunda División.

Ceballos made his debut in La Liga on 5 September 1993, in a 1–0 home win against Rayo Vallecano, going on to start in most of that and the following seven seasons, always in the top division. Racing dropped down to the second level in 2001, and he retired two years later at nearly 35.

Ceballos returned to his only team in 2007, being named its youth sides' goalkeeper coach.

See also
List of one-club men

References

External links

Racing Santander archives 

1968 births
Living people
People from Trasmiera
Spanish footballers
Footballers from Cantabria
Association football goalkeepers
La Liga players
Segunda División players
Segunda División B players
Rayo Cantabria players
Racing de Santander players
20th-century Spanish people
21st-century Spanish people